The 2002 Indian vice-presidential election was held on 12 August 2002 to elect the newly vacated post of Vice-President of India. Bhairon Singh Shekhawat defeated Sushil Kumar Shinde to become 11th Vice President of India. Incumbent VP Krishan Kant did not contest the election and died before the election occurred.

Candidates

Results

|- align=center
!style="background-color:#E9E9E9" class="unsortable"|
!style="background-color:#E9E9E9" align=center|Candidate
!style="background-color:#E9E9E9" |Party
!style="background-color:#E9E9E9" |Electoral Votes
!style="background-color:#E9E9E9" |% of Votes
|-
| 
|align="left"|Bhairon Singh Shekhawat||align="left"|BJP||454||59.82
|-
| 
|align="left"|Sushil Kumar Shinde||align="left"|INC||305||40.18
|-
| colspan="5" style="background:#e9e9e9;"|
|-
! colspan="3" style="text-align:left;"| Total
! style="text-align:right;"|759
! style="text-align:right;"|100.00
|-
| colspan="5" style="background:#e9e9e9;"| 
|-
|-
|colspan="3" style="text-align:left;"|Valid Votes||759||99.09
|-
|colspan="3" style="text-align:left;"|Invalid Votes||7||0.91
|-
|colspan="3" style="text-align:left;"|Turnout||766||96.96
|-
|colspan="3" style="text-align:left;"|Abstentions||24||3.04
|-
|colspan="3" style="text-align:left;"|Electors||790|| style="background:#e9e9e9;"|
|-
|}

See also
 2002 Indian presidential election

References

External links

Vice-presidential elections in India
India